The Bell Buckle Historic District is a National Register-listed historic district in Bell Buckle, Tennessee.

The district includes downtown Bell Buckle and the campus of Webb School. Buildings in the district date from the late 19th century and early 20th century. The historic district was listed on the National Register of Historic Places in 1976, during the United States Bicentennial.

References

Victorian architecture in Tennessee
Italianate architecture in Tennessee
Bedford County, Tennessee
Historic districts on the National Register of Historic Places in Tennessee
National Register of Historic Places listings in Bedford County, Tennessee
National Register of Historic Places in Bedford County, Tennessee
1976 establishments in Tennessee